Inga calcicola is a species of plant in the family Fabaceae. It is found only in Mexico.

References

calcicola
Flora of Mexico
Vulnerable plants
Taxonomy articles created by Polbot